Pakdeh (also Romanized as Pākdeh and Pāk Deh; also known as paydeh'' and Pāyadi''') is a village next to  Jirandeh Rural District, Amarlu District, Rudbar County, Gilan Province, Iran. At the 2006 census, its population was 612, in 210 families.

References 

Populated places in Rudbar County